Khaidi ( Prisoner) is a 1984 Indian Kannada-language film, written by Chi. Udaya Shankar, directed by K. S. R. Das and produced by G. R. K. Raju. The film stars Vishnuvardhan, Aarathi, Madhavi and Jayamalini in the lead roles. The film has musical score by K. Chakravarthy. Cinematography was done by V. Lakshman.

The film is a remake of the Telugu movie of the same name which itself was loosely inspired by the 1982 movie First Blood. The film tells the story of a hardworking young man and his revenge against the people who killed his father and sister and sent him to jail, by falsely accusing him of killing his sister.

Plot
Veerabhadraiah is a feudal lord presiding over a village along with his henchmen, which include his assistant and the village sarpanch. Veerabhadraiah lends money to Venkateswarlu, a local farmer living with his widowed daughter. His son Suryam is a hard working student living in the nearby city and he falls in love with Veerabhadraiah's daughter – Madhulatha. Realising this, Veerabhadraiah asks Venkateswarlu to ask his son to stop seeing his daughter, to which Venkateswarlu does not agree. Veerabhadraiah kills Venkateswarlu and asks Suryam to pay the money which he had given as a loan. Suryam asks for some time and with the help of his elder sister raises crops to repay. Just as the crops are ready for harvest, Veerabhadraiah and his henchmen not only destroy the crop but also try to sexually abuse Suryam's sister, during which she commits suicide. Being the village head, Veerabhadraiah implicates Suryam in the death of his sister, saying that he was forcing her into prostitution, due to which his sister committed suicide. Suryam is arrested by the Police. The rest of the movie deals with how Suryam escapes from jail and with the help of Sujatha, a doctor, he avenges the decimation of his family.

Cast
 Vishnuvardhan
 Aarathi
 Madhavi
 Jayamalini
 Sangeeta
 Nithya
 Anuradha
 Dheerendra Gopal
 Sudarshan
 Mukhyamantri Chandru
 B. K. Shankar
 Thyagaraj Urs
 Dingri Nagaraj
 Manu in Guest Appearance
 Rajakumar
 Pattabhi
 Ranga
 Lakshminarayana Murthy
 Madan
 Srikanth
 Suryakumar

Soundtracks 

 Surasundari E Menakayu - S P Balasubrahmanyam and P Susheela
 Thalay Hoova Edayinda - S P Balasubrahmanyam and P Susheela
 Muthay Maniye - Vishnuvardhan and S Janaki
 Naale Enna Beda - S Janaki
 Endoe Kanda Nenapu - S P Balasubrahmanyam and P Susheela

References

External links
 

1984 films
1980s Kannada-language films
Films directed by K. S. R. Das
Films scored by K. Chakravarthy
Kannada remakes of Telugu films
1984 action thriller films
Indian action thriller films